is the eighth studio album by Japanese singer Akina Nakamori. It was released on 10 August 1985 under the Warner Pioneer label. The album includes renewed version of the smash hit "Meu amor é...".

Background
D404ME is the second studio album released in 1985, four months after her previous studio album Bitter and Sweet. The initial number and letters from the album means .

The music production team consist a various big hit makers during 80's period such as Aska from duo Chage and Aska, Joe Hisaishi, Takashi Tsushimi, Kiyoshiro Imawano from rock band RC Succession, Taeko Ohnuki or Tsugutoshi Gotō.

In the earlier editions of newsletter from Nakamori's fanclub Milkyway, was included prototype version of lyrics of "Nocturne" and "Blue Ocean".

Promotion

Single
It consists of one previously released single, "Meu amor é..." The single has received the highest claimed musical award in the 27th Japan Record Awards in 1985. The album version has subtitle New Re-mix version and includes renewed arrangement. The intro begins with the sound of acoustic instruments, while the original version starts with the heavy orchestral instrumentation. The original version of Mi Amore was included in the second compilation album "Best" in 1986.

Following studio albums for four years doesn't include any promotion single, instead they include completely new recorded album tracks.

Stage performances
Endless, Allegro Vivace, Nocturne, Mona Lisa and Blue Ocean were performed in Nakamori's live tour Light and Shade in 1986. As of 2019, it doesn't exist a live footage neither it was broadcast in the TV.

None of the original album tracks (aside of original version of Mi Amore) hasn't been performed in the television music programs.

Charting performance
The album reached number 1 on the Oricon Album Weekly Charts. LP Record version charted 28 weeks, Cassette tape version debuted on number 1 as well and charted 36 weeks and sold over 651,100 copies. The album remained at number 7 on the Oricon Album Yearly Charts in 1985. As result, in the December 1985 it was nominated in 27th Japan Record Awards and won title The Album of the Year.

Track listing

Notes:
"Endless," "Blue Ocean" and "Star Pilot" are stylised in all uppercase.

Covers
Japanese singer from rock band RC Succession, Kiyoshiro Imawano covered Star Pilot under different title "Sky Pilot" and was released as a single on 21 November 1995.

Japanese idol-singer, Miho Nakayama covered "Mona Lisa" in her first live tour Virgin Flight in 1986.

References

1985 albums
Japanese-language albums
Akina Nakamori albums
Warner Music Japan albums